Leander Club, founded in 1818, is one of the oldest rowing clubs in the world, and the oldest non-academic club. It is based in Remenham in Berkshire, England and adjoins Henley-on-Thames. Only three other surviving clubs were founded prior to Leander: Brasenose College Boat Club and Jesus College Boat Club (the two competing in a Head race in 1815) and Westminster School Boat Club, founded in 1813.

History

Leander was founded on the Tideway in 1818 or 1819 by members of the old "Star" and "Arrow" Clubs and membership was at first limited to sixteen. "The Star" and "the Arrow" clubs died out sometime in the 1820s and Leander itself was in full swing by 1825. By 1830 it was looked upon as a well-known and long-established boat club.

In its early days, Leander was as much a social association as a competitive club and it was steered by a waterman. It was the first club to support young watermen and instituted a coat and badge for scullers.
In 1831, Leander defeated Oxford University in a race rowed from Hambleden Lock to Henley Bridge, but when it lost the match with Cambridge six years later, Lord Esher noted at a dinner that Leander was:

However, Lord Esher also noted that they were "verging on being middle-aged men."
Until 1856, the number of members was limited to twenty-five men. After this date membership was increased to thirty-five and the limit finally abolished in 1862. In 1858 Leander began to recruit members from both Oxford University and Cambridge University.

Its first home is assumed to have been Searle's yard, Stangate – on the south bank of the River Thames (on land currently occupied by St Thomas's Hospital). In 1860 the membership moved the club to Putney where a small piece of land was rented on which a tent was erected for housing boats. This land was bought by London Rowing Club in 1864 and is the site of LRC's current clubhouse.
Leander was able to lease a piece of land adjoining and in 1866 started to construct a boathouse. Thirty years later, in 1897, the club purchased land in Henley-on-Thames and built its current clubhouse. The club's centre of gravity moved rapidly to Henley, although the Putney boathouse was retained until 1961.

Leander entered a crew at Henley Royal Regatta for the first time in 1840, the year following the regatta's foundation. Their crew which won the Grand Challenge Cup included Thomas Lowther Jenkins in the 5 seat. Jenkins' winner's medal was discovered in a Belfast junk shop more than 130 years later by a member who donated it to the club, where it sits in one of the trophy cabinets.

For the first 179 years of its existence, Leander was a male-only club but has accepted women members since 1998. On 1 January 2013 Debbie Flood was elected as the club's first female captain, and was re-elected the following year.

Leander was one of five clubs which retained the right until 2012 to appoint representatives to the Council of British Rowing.  The others were London Rowing Club, Thames Rowing Club, Oxford University Boat Club and Cambridge University Boat Club.

Leander members contributed 23 of the 45 British rowers selected for the 2020 Summer Olympics.

Notable members
Notable members include:

 Jack Beaumont
 Karen Bennett
 Robin Bourne-Taylor
 Chloe Brew
 Sholto Carnegie
 John Collins
 Ed Coode
 James Cracknell
 Jacob Dawson
 Katherine Douglas
 Rebecca Edwards
 Charles Elwes
 Henry Fieldman
 Debbie Flood
 Emily Ford
 Thomas Ford
 Tim Foster
 Fiona Gammond
 Thomas George
 Harcourt Gilbey Gold
 Jürgen Gröbler
 Angus Groom
 Mark Hunter
 Frederick Septimus Kelly
 Hugh Laurie
 Ran Laurie
 Harry Leask
 Alexander McCulloch
 Rowan McKellar
 Gully Nickalls
 Guy Nickalls
 Alex Partridge
 Matthew Pinsent
 Steve Redgrave
 Pete Reed
 Rebecca Romero
 Matthew Rossiter
 Will Satch
 Hannah Scott
 Colin Smith
 Tom Stallard
 Polly Swann
 Victoria Thornley
 Anna Watkins
 Josh West
 Steve Williams
 Oliver Wynne-Griffith

In fiction
In Evelyn Waugh's novel Brideshead Revisited, the character Cousin Jasper (who "had come within appreciable distance of getting his rowing blue") wears a Leander Club tie when he first calls upon the protagonist Charles Ryder to offer advice on being a student at Oxford.:24,25 In the 1981 television adaptation, Cousin Jasper (played by Stephen Moore) is depicted wearing the Leander's "city" tie (dark blue with small pink hippopotamus motifs).
In the novel Growing Up by Angela Thirkell, the Rev. Tommy Needham "thought how well his college and Leander oars, never to be used again, would look upon the wall...."  The Leander Club figures heavily in Deborah Crombie's detective novel, No Mark Upon Her.

Honours

Recent British champions

Key
 J (junior), 2, 4, 8 (crew size), 18, 16, 15, 14 (age group), x (sculls), - (coxless), + (coxed)

Henley Royal Regatta

+ composite

See also

 Henley Royal Regatta
 London Rowing Club
 Thames Rowing Club
 Rowing on the River Thames

References

External links
 Leander Club official website

1818 establishments in England
Sports clubs established in the 1810s
Rowing clubs of the River Thames
Henley-on-Thames
Boathouses in the United Kingdom
Henley Royal Regatta
Sports clubs in Berkshire
Rowing in Berkshire
History of rowing
Remenham